Elizabeth Stubbs House is a historic home located at Little Creek, Kent County, Delaware.  It was built about 1866, and is a two-story, three bay, frame and weatherboard dwelling with rear wings.  It has a grey slate, concave, mansard roof with gable dormers.  It features oversized dentil moldings on the roof cornice and on the door and window lintels, cut out scrolls on the dormers, and patterned square and hexagonal slate roof tiles.

It was listed on the National Register of Historic Places in 1982.

References

Houses on the National Register of Historic Places in Delaware
Second Empire architecture in Delaware
Houses completed in 1866
Houses in Kent County, Delaware
1866 establishments in Delaware
National Register of Historic Places in Kent County, Delaware